Kawi is a Unicode block containing characters for Kawi script. The script was used historically in insular Southeast Asia to write the Old Javanese, Sanskrit, Old Malay, Old Balinese, and Old Sundanese languages.

Block

History 
The following Unicode-related documents record the purpose and process of defining specific characters in the Kawi block:

References 

Unicode blocks